Nationalities of Spain can refer to:

 Nationalities and regions of Spain, for constitutional designation of certain subnational political entities
 National and regional identity in Spain, for political movements and ideologies
 Spanish nationality law
 Spaniards or Spanish people, a national term for people from any part of Spain